Triveni Engineering & Industries Limited (TEIL) is an Indian conglomerate with diversified businesses in sugar and engineering, headquartered in Noida, India. It was founded in 1932. The company is engaged in sugar and alcohol, including ethanol production, power co-generation, power transmission, including industrial gears & gearboxes and defence, water treatment solutions and FMCG brands. It is the second-largest sugar producer in India.

History 

The company was founded on 27 July 1932, under the Companies Act 2013, as The Ganga Sugar Corporation Limited. It received a certificate of commencement of business on 6 February 1933. It acquired the Khatauli sugar plant in 1952.

In 1973, it was renamed Gangeshwar Limited from The Ganga Sugar Corporation. It was renamed Triveni Engineering & Industries Limited in 2000.

In 2005, it started a rural retail chain, Khushali Bazaar, under its fully-owned retail arm, Triveni Retail Ventures Ltd, which operated in Uttar Pradesh and Uttarakhand. Later, it was shut down in 2013.

In 2007, the company entered the alcohol business by setting up its first distillery in Muzaffarpur, which has a capacity to produce 160 kilo per day. In 2019, the company set up another distillery at Sabitgarh unit with a capacity of 160KLPD.

On 13 June 2018, a concession agreement was signed between National Mission for Clean Ganga (NMCG), Uttar Pradesh Jal Nigam, and Triveni Engineering to develop India's first city-wide integrated sewage infrastructure for Mathura at an estimated cost of over ₹437 crore on a Hybrid Annuity-based mode.

In 2020, the company forayed into the country liquor space by launching four liquor brands, including Miss Rangeeli and Shahenshah. In March 2021, it was assigned to build a desalination plant in the Maldives.

In November 2021, Engineering Power Transmission business signed a 10-year contract with US-based GEAE Technology to manufacture the 'LM2500' gas turbine base and enclosure, which powers many of the Indian Navy's vessels.

Operations 
The company operates seven sugar mills at Khatauli, Deoband, Sabitgarh, Chandanpur, Rani Nangal, Milak Narayanpur and Ramkola in Uttar Pradesh. The company also has two co-generation power plants at Khatauli (46 MW), Deoband (22 MW) and a 160000 litre per day capacity distillery in Muzaffarnagar. TEIL has co-generation plants with a total capacity to generate power of 105 MW.

It has gear manufacturing facility in Mysore. It is engaged in manufacturing high-speed gears and gearboxes of up to 70MW capacity with speeds of 70,000 RPM.

The company also sells refined sugar (40 per cent) and produces pharma grade sugar, which it sells mainly through institutional buyers, like soft drinks, candy and ice-cream makers. TEIL is also into water treatment solutions and has undertaken various sewage treatment projects. The company has got 120 plants working over the last few decades. In the EPC division, Triveni had undertaken hydel projects, waste treatment and water projects and coal beneficiation and minerals concession projects.

The company is engaged in manufacturing defence products mainly related to the Indian Navy. Their defence supplies include propulsion systems, steam turbines and turbo steam engines. Its 80 per cent of the business comes from sugar production, while its ethanol business contributes to about 10 per cent of the turnover.

Financials  

Awards and recognition 
 The company was ranked at 5 in the list of 'Top 10 Sugar Companies by Highest Sales in India', by Indiastat India Top 10 Yearbook 2016.
 It was awarded the Frost & Sullivan Growth Excellence Award in the water and wastewater treatment industry category by Frost & Sullivan in 2010.
 The company won the Greentech Platinum Safety Award and Greentech Silver Safety Award.
 The Khatauli co-generation plant won the Gold award in EKDKN Innov Award 2017 under the OHS category in power.
 In 2017, the distillery unit won the Golden Peacock Business Excellence Award in the chemical sector from the Institute of Directors (India).

See also 

 Sugar industry of India

References 

Sugar companies of India
Conglomerate companies of India
Sugar refineries
Indian companies established in 1932
Engineering companies of India
Energy companies of India
Alcohol fuel producers
Electric-generation companies of India
Drink companies of India
Agriculture companies established in 1932
Manufacturing companies based in Noida
Food and drink companies established in 1932
1932 establishments in India
Companies listed on the National Stock Exchange of India
Companies listed on the Bombay Stock Exchange